The Tall Stranger is a 1957 American CinemaScope Western film directed by Thomas Carr and starring Joel McCrea and Virginia Mayo. It is based on the novel of the same name by Louis L'Amour.

Plot
A Union soldier return to his western home at the end of the Civil War and finds himself caught in the middle of a land war between his greedy half-brother and a wagon train of Confederate homesteaders.

Cast
 Joel McCrea as Ned Bannon  
 Virginia Mayo as Ellen  
 Barry Kelley as Hardy Bishop  
 Michael Pate as Charley
 Michael Ansara as Zarata  
 Leo Gordon as Stark 
 Whit Bissell as Adam Judson  
 Ray Teal as Cap
 James Dobson as Dud  
 Phil Phillips as Will (as Philip Phillips)
 George N. Neise as Mort Harper (as George Neise)
 Robert Foulk as Pagones
 Adam Kennedy as Red  
 Jennifer Lea as Mary (as Jenifer Lea)

References

Bibliography
 Pitts, Michael R. Western Movies: A Guide to 5,105 Feature Films. McFarland, 2012.

External links

1957 films
1957 Western (genre) films
American Western (genre) films
Films directed by Thomas Carr
Films produced by Walter Mirisch
Allied Artists films
CinemaScope films
Films scored by Hans J. Salter
1950s English-language films
1950s American films